This article lists the colonial governors of Papua New Guinea, from the establishment of German New Guinea in 1884 until the independence of the Territory of Papua and New Guinea in 1975.

List 

(Dates in italics indicate de facto continuation of office)

New Guinea 

In 1945, the Territory of New Guinea was merged with the Territory of Papua to form the Territory of Papua and New Guinea. The merger was formalized with the passage of the Papua and New Guinea Act 1949.

Papua 

In 1945, the Territory of Papua was merged with the Territory of New Guinea to form the Territory of Papua and New Guinea. The merger was formalized with the passage of the Papua and New Guinea Act 1949.

Papua New Guinea 

On 16 September 1975, Papua New Guinea achieved independence following the passage of the Papua New Guinea Independence Act 1975.  For a list of viceroys in Papua New Guinea after independence, see Governor-General of Papua New Guinea.

See also 

 Papua New Guinea
 Politics of Papua New Guinea
 Governor-General of Papua New Guinea
 Prime Minister of Papua New Guinea
 Lists of office-holders

References

External links 
 Rulers.org: Papua New Guinea
 Worldstatesmen.org: Papua New Guinea

History of Papua New Guinea
 
List
List
List
German New Guinea
Territory of New Guinea people
Territory of Papua people
Territory of Papua and New Guinea people
Papua New Guinea–United Kingdom relations
Australia–Papua New Guinea relations
Colonial governors
Lists of colonial governors and administrators